Kozhi Koovuthu is a 1982 Indian Tamil-language film, written and directed by Gangai Amaran in his debut. The film stars Prabhu, Suresh, Smitha and Viji in her acting debut. The film has music by Ilaiyaraaja, cinematography by P. S. Nivas, editing by B. Lenin, and was released on 25 December 1982.

Plot 

Velusamy is a macho and everybody in the village fears him because of his rude and offensive talks, but Velusamy is good at heart and helpful to the needy. Ramakrishna, an orphan,  is appointed as postman in this rural community of Anaikaraipatti. Kamakshi, the daughter of Velusamy's elder sister Vellathaayi, initially misunderstands Ramakrishna and has tiffs with him. Vellathaayi insists on Velusamy to have his livelihood as she wishes arrange her daughter's marriage with him, but villagers oppose the same and insult Velusamy. Notwithstanding the insult, Velusamy promises to prove himself and the villagers of his worth, and joins the military. The rest of the story forms what happens to the relationship between them.

Cast 
Prabhu as Velusamy
Suresh as Ramakrishnan
Smitha as Chittu
Viji as Kamakshi
Bindu Ghosh
Karikol Raju
Kumarimuthu
Parthiban

Production 
Kozhi Koovuthu is the directorial debut of Gangai Amaran. The title was suggested by his brother Ilaiyaraaja. It is also the acting debut of Viji. Editing was handled by B. Lenin.

Soundtrack 
The music was composed by Ilaiyaraaja. The song "Edho Moham Edho Dhagam" is set in the Carnatic raga known as Nayaki, and "Poove Ilaiya Poove" is set to Sankarabharanam. "Annae Annae" is the only filmi song sung by Samuel Grubb.

Reception 
Jayamanmadhan of Kalki criticised Viji's performance and the film's resemblance to Alaigal Oivathillai (1981) in many parts, but appreciated the music. The film ran for over 300 days in theatres.

References

Bibliography

External links 
 

1980s Tamil-language films
1982 directorial debut films
1982 films
Films directed by Gangai Amaran
Films scored by Ilaiyaraaja